Six Persimmons is a 13th-century Chinese painting by the monk Muqi Fachang. It was painted during the Song dynasty. Muqi was one of the two great exponents of the spontaneous mode of Chinese painting (the other being Liang Kai). It features six persimmons floating on an undefined, but skillfully mottled background. It is painted in blue-black ink on paper.

The painting became famous for the tremendous skill of the brushstrokes. Their subtlety of modeling is often remarked upon. The thick and thin brushstrokes that model the lightest of the persimmons make it seem to float in contrast to the dark one next to it. The treatment of the stems and leaves recall Chinese characters, and reveal brush control at its highest level. Professor James Cahill of the University of California Berkeley devoted an entire lecture to it, available online.

It currently resides in the Juko'in subtemple of Daitoku-ji in Kyoto, Japan.  It is seldom displayed to the public.

Footnotes

References
Lee, Sherman E. (1994), A History of Far Eastern Art (5th ed.), Harry N. Abrams Inc., New York, NY
Waley, Arthur (1923), An Introduction to the Study of Chinese Painting, Benn, London

Song dynasty paintings
Persimmon
Food and drink paintings